Mexicargo  was a cargo airline based in Mexico City.

Company history
Mexicargo was founded on August 18, 1991 by Marco Mediola and began flights in February 1996 using a Boeing 727-225F.  The airline operated cargo flights between Mexico and the United States.  It is unclear when the airline ceased operations, but the last two Boeing 707 were seen at Mexico City airport in 2000.

Cities served in 1997 were:  Guadalajara, Hermosillo, La Paz (Baja California del Sur), Mexico City  and Tijuana in Mexico.  Miami and San Antonio in the United States.

Historical fleet details

3 - Boeing 727-225F
1 - Boeing 707-323C
1 - Boeing 707-347C
1 - Douglas DC-9-15RC

not all aircraft were operated at the same time.

External links
 Data
AirlinersNet photo

References

Defunct airlines of Mexico
Defunct cargo airlines
Cargo airlines of Mexico
1991 establishments in Mexico
Airlines established in 1991